Gaba or GABA may refer to:

Places 
 Gąba, a village in Poland
 Jaba', Haifa, a village near Mount Carmel, Israel also known as Gaba
 Jab'a, a village in the West Bank, southwest of Jerusalem, also known as Gaba
 Gaba, a Persian city located in what is now known as Isfahan
 Gaba, a suburb of Makindye, Kampala, Uganda, on the shores of Lake Victoria
 Gaba railway station on the Chinese Qingzang Railway

People 
 Gaba Kulka, Polish artist
 Harold Gaba, American businessman
 Lester Gaba, a US sculptor, writer and retail display designer
 Marianne Gaba, a US model
 Milan Gába, a former Czechoslovak slalom canoeist
 Millind Gaba, Indian musician and celebrity
 Mo Gaba, American sports superfan and radio personality
 Pierre Toura Gaba (1920–1998), a Chadian politician and diplomat

Biology 
 Gamma-Aminobutyric acid or GABA, the main inhibitory neurotransmitter in the central nervous system
 GABA receptor, in biology

Other uses 
 Gabâ or gabaa (Philippines), the concept of negative karma among the Cebuano people
 Gába, a Sami magazine of Norway
 GABA tea, commonly used name for tea passed through anoxic fermentation
 Gaba Corporation, an English conversation school in Japan
 GABA International, an oral care company owned by Colgate-Palmolive

See also 
 Gabba (disambiguation)
 Gabaa (disambiguation)